The 2017 Nunavut general election was held on October 30, 2017 to return the members of the 5th Nunavut Legislature. The fifth general election held since the creation of the territory in 1999, it was the first election held under Nunavut's new fixed election dates law, which requires elections to be held no more than four years after the prior election.

Unlike most federal or provincial elections in Canada, elections to the Legislative Assembly of Nunavut are conducted on a non-partisan consensus government model, in which all candidates run as independents rather than being nominated by political parties. The premier and executive council are then selected internally by the MLAs at the first special sitting of the legislature.

Candidates
As of the close of nominations on September 29, 2017, three MLAs, Steve Mapsalak, Keith Peterson and Premier Peter Taptuna were the only incumbents not running again. One district, Kugluktuk, saw only one candidate register by the close of nominations; that candidate, Mila Adjukak Kamingoak, was immediately declared as acclaimed to office.

In one district, Cambridge Bay, formal declaration of the winner was not made until November 5, with the initial results undergoing an automatic recount due to a margin of less than two per cent between the top two finishers. The recount confirmed that the original count was correct.

Followup
A record number of women were elected to the legislature; in addition to Kamingoak's acclamation, four more women were declared elected on election night, and a woman won the recount in Cambridge Bay. These six women, representing 27 per cent of the legislature, represent the first time in the territory's history that it has ranked higher than last or second-last among Canada's provinces and territories for female membership in the legislature.

Following the election, only three of the eight incumbent cabinet ministers had been reelected: three were defeated and two, including Premier Peter Taptuna, chose not to run again. Overall, half of the legislature's 22 incumbents were reelected.

On November 17, 2017, the Nunavut Leadership Forum convened in Iqaluit to choose the next premier. MLAs Joe Savikataaq, Cathy Towtongie, Patterk Netser, and Paul Quassa put their names forward; ultimately, Quassa was elected premier, and Joe Enook was chosen as Speaker. The Executive Council was to consist of David Akeeagok, Pat Angnakak, Jeannie Ehaloak, David Joanasie, Lorne Kusugak, Savikataaq, and Elisapee Sheutiapik.

In 2018, however, Quassa lost a confidence vote in the legislature, and was succeeded as premier by Savikataaq.

Results
The Legislative Assembly is run on a consensus government system, in which all MLAs sit as independents and are not organized into political parties. Note, accordingly, that colours in the following charts are used solely to indicate candidate status, not political party affiliations.

Statistics

Candidates

As of November 1, all results are unofficial.

References

2017 elections in Canada
2017
October 2017 events in Canada
2017 in Nunavut